Tuonen viemää is the second single from the Ruoska album, Radium.  It also features the band's only b-side, Alistaja.

Track listings
 "Tuonen viemää"
 "Kosketa"
 "Alistaja"
 "Tuonen viemää (remix)"
 "Kosketa (remix)"

References

External links
 Additional information (in Finnish)
 "Tuonen viemää" lyrics
 "Kosketa" lyrics

Ruoska songs
2005 singles
2004 songs